In snakes, the anal scale (or anal plate) is the scale just in front of and covering the cloacal opening. This scale can be either single ("anal entire") or paired ("anal divided"). When paired, the division is oblique. The anal scale is preceded by the ventral scales and followed by the subcaudal scales.

See also
Snake scales

References

Snake scales